Key Sato (28 October 1906 – 8 May 1978) was a Japanese painter. His work was part of the painting event in the art competition at the 1936 Summer Olympics.

References

1906 births
1978 deaths
20th-century Japanese painters
Japanese painters
Olympic competitors in art competitions
People from Ōita Prefecture